was a Japanese politician who served as governor of Hiroshima Prefecture from October 1922 to October 1923. He was governor of Kōchi Prefecture (1919–1922).

References

Governors of Hiroshima
1875 births
1928 deaths
Japanese Home Ministry government officials
Governors of Kochi Prefecture